Middle Atlantic Intercollegiate Sailing Association (MAISA) is one of the seven conferences affiliated with the Inter-Collegiate Sailing Association that schedule and administer regattas within their established geographic regions.

MAISA organizes and regulates intercollegiate sailing in Ontario, New York, New Jersey, Pennsylvania, Delaware, Maryland, Virginia, West Virginia, and the District of Columbia. 

The conference consists of fifty-five member universities.

Members

References

External links

ICSA conferences